Zhou Yan (born March 22, 1988), known as "GAI", is a Chinese rapper, singer, and songwriter. He achieved a meteoric rise from a contestant on a rap show to become the most successful hip hop stars in China today, and is partially responsible for the rise of the genre itself.

His stage name GAI is a childhood nickname meaning "lid" that he was given because of his bowl cut.

In his early days as an underground rapper, GAI was leading his music label GO$H!, a local label in Chongqing, China.  He is one of the few Chinese rappers actively producing trap and Gangsta rap. He helped create a type of Trap music called "C-Trap". His famous songs include "超社会 Gangsta" (2015), "空城计 Empty Fort Strategy" (2016), "火锅底料Hot Pot Soup" (2017), "虎山行 Entering Danger", "威远故事 My Story"

In 2017, GAI's music career began to boom after attending iQiyi's Hip-Hop reality show The Rap of China, and winning the contest.

In 2018, he married his girlfriend Wang Siran.

In the 4th season of The Rap of China in 2020, GAI appeared as one of the four producers leading a team of aspiring rappers. He was the only person on the show to appear as both a contestant and a producer.
In The New Generation Hip-Hop Project China, GAI appeared as a mentor and a producer.
In The Rap Of China 2022, he became the leader of the squad "Champion Forever", which includes Bridge and Kung-Fu Pen.
He invested Dream Music Group, where he is signed. And now Dream Music Group signed him, Bridge, Vava, Will.T., 艾热AIR，早安，L4WUDU From GOSH.

Early life 
GAI was born in prefectural level city of Yibin, Sichuan. His father was an accountant at a coal mine. At 10 years old his family moved to Weiyuan so his older sister could attend a better school. He became a gangster at age 13 due to school bullying; and he was put into a youth detention center at the age of 16. After he stabbed the son of the director of the Local Tax Department during a gang fight, Gai's parents moved him to Chongqing to avoid further conflicts. He attempted to join the army but failed the health exam and instead attended Chongqing Water Resources and Electric Engineering College.

After graduating college in Chongqing, Gai began to make a living by performing as a club singer, DJ or MC. He then later resigned from these positions to focus on his rap career.

Career 
Underground Career

As an underground rapper, GAI joined a Chongqing native gangsta rap group, "Brass Knuckle Gang" (also known as B.K.G). At this time, his song "Gangsta" (lit: "Black Society"), became a major hit in the Chinese underground hip hop circle. The lyrics contain a great deal of controversy in terms of social values because of the description of the true gangster life.
GAI also participated in Sing! China, a music reality show on Zhejiang Television, by his real name, but was eliminated in the first round.

Television

The Rap of China

GAI participated The Rap of China in summer 2017. He was chosen by producer MC HotDog and Chang Chen-yue by singing his song Hot Pot Soup, and later joined their team.

By collaborating with Jackson Wang (Papillon (2017)), GAI reached the final stage, competing against other famous rappers such as AfterJourney, PG One and Jony J. Gai eventually tied the vote with PG One and the two shared the championship.

Gai later became a producer on the 2020 season of Rap Of China, joining Jane Zhang, Kris Wu and Wilber Pan in the producer's seat. Gai was also a mentor on the 2021 season. He is currently competing in the 2022 season of Rap Of China, which is the All Star Season featuring popular rappers from the previous seasons.

Call Me By Fire

GAI joined the cast of Call Me By Fire as a contestant in 2021.

Music style

C-Trap 
GAI's music is deeply influenced by his early life, Chinese history and Wuxia stories. He combined trap, Chinese Style Music and his dialect rapping forming the genre, which is widely known as "C-Trap". In his early rap life, his lyrics often describe the violence, sex, drugs and lives at the bottom part of Chinese society. When he started to transform from underground rapper to a mainstream rapper during The Rap of China in 2017, his choice of lyrics began to shift more into Chinese philosophy and Chinese culture. He was credited as an innovator and trailblazer of Chinese Hip-Hop music.

Local Cultural Influences
GAI often references Chongqing, and with Bridge has popularized the catchphrase "This is Fog City!" [pronounced "less voo doo!"] (i.e. Chongqing). For example, he has a song named "Chongqing Soul".

His music is notable for extensive use of his native Neijiang dialect, which is actually closer to Zigong dialect than Chongqing dialect.

For example, his song "Itinerant Monk" (a rap version of Cui Jian's famous song "Fake Monk") converts some Standard Mandarin lyrics to Sichuanese influenced Standard Chinese:

Standard Mandarin: ("But don't know who I am")

Sichuanese: (where is pronounced ngo and as la)

Popular songs in Sichuan dialect

"Trash Talk" (2018); pinyin: Lā jī huà

"Hot Pot Soup" (2017); pinyin: Huǒguō dǐ liào

"BKG" (2015); pinyin: Qiǎng bì

"Gangster" (the title itself is Sichuan dialect); (2015); pinyin: Chāo shèhuì

Mixtapes

Ren Yi Li Zhi Xin (2016)

Singles

 ”Gangsta" (as B.K.G Gai) (2015)
 “Daydreamer" (2015)
 ”Coin Robbery (featuring Tory as B.K.G Gai)" (2015)
 “Zhanmadao (Masiwei Diss Back)" (2015)
 “Ironman (featuring MX)" (2015)
 ”Supermacy (featuring Flowmatic)" (2015)
 “Your daddy me got upset (featuring Kenzy)" (2015)
 ”Yan Ru Yu (featuring CJ BADA$$)" (2015)
 "W.I.$.H" (2016)
 "Empty Fort Strategy" (2016)
 "Trash Talk" (2016)
 "Paper (featuring CJ BADA$$)" (2016)
 "Wandering Monk" (2016),  a rap version of "Fake Monk" by Cui Jian
 "Rainbow (featuring Bridge)" (2017)
 "Hot Pot Soup" (2017)
 "Hot Pot Soup (Korea Version)" (2017)
 "Beware of Fire" (2017)
 "Blue Sea Laughter" (2018), a rap version of "Blue Sea Laughter" by Sam Hui (1990)
 "The Long River" (2018) with Damnshine (of C-BLOCK) & Bridge
 "Firefly" (2018)
 "The Great Wall"(2018)

EPs 

"GAIn" (2017)

Featured in 

 I Wrote A Song And Got High on a Car (Tory Montana featuring GAI as B.K.G Gai) (2015)
 Lovely Girl (3Bangz featuring GAI) (2015)
 Guan Que Lou (B.Angelo featuring GAI) (2016)
 The Flow Of Jiang-Hu(C-Block featuring GAI) (2017)
 Chongqing Cypher(Tory, Bridge and GAI) (2017)
 Under The Setting Sun (Yaksha featuring GAI and DJ WORDY) (2017)

Promotional singles 

 Guess Do I Guess (featuring Bridge) (2017)
 King Advents (2017)
 Call For Dream (2017)
 How To Live Without Money (2017)

References

External links 

Living people
1987 births
Chinese male singer-songwriters
People from Neijiang
People from Yibin
21st-century Chinese male singers